Frank A. Griffiths (December 17, 1916 – April 7, 1994) was a Canadian media executive through his company, Western International Communications Ltd. (WIC). 
 
Frank Griffiths was born in Burnaby, British Columbia, Canada. In 1956, along with Walter Stewart Owen, he acquired New Westminster radio station CKNW and later established the Western Broadcasting Company Ltd. (forerunner of WIC) as the station's parent company. He expanded to own a number of other radio stations as well as CBC Television and CTV affiliate stations.

He was the owner of the NHL's Vancouver Canucks from 1974 until his death in 1994 (although he would surrender majority control to his son Arthur in 1988), he was inducted into the Hockey Hall of Fame as a builder in 1992. He was also inducted in the Canadian Business Hall of Fame in 1994.

After Griffiths' death, the Canucks for the remainder of the season and playoffs wore a patch with the words "2Pts FG" meaning "2 points for Frank Griffiths" (2 points being earned by an NHL team for winning a game)—Griffiths' signature phrase he used instead of "win".

External links
 

1916 births
1994 deaths
Canadian mass media owners
Hockey Hall of Fame inductees
National Hockey League executives
National Hockey League owners
People from Burnaby
Vancouver Canucks executives
20th-century American businesspeople